The Association of Child Protection Professionals (AoCPP), formerly the British Association for the Prevention of Child Abuse and Neglect (BASPCAN), is an anti-child abuse charity established in June 1979 by a group led by British paediatricians Alfred White Franklin and Tina Cooper. The Association aims to bring together professionals from social services, medicine, law, police, courts, probation and education to promote best practice tackling child abuse.

The Association's official journal is Child Abuse Review, launched in 1992 and published since its inception by Wiley.

References

External links
 https://www.childprotectionprofessionals.org.uk

Organizations established in 1979
1979 establishments in the United Kingdom
Child abuse in the United Kingdom
Child welfare in the United Kingdom
Non-profit organisations based in the United Kingdom